Donald James Ramer  is a Canadian police officer who served as interim chief of police with the Toronto Police Service (TPS) from August 1, 2020 to December 19, 2022.

Education 
Ramer graduated from the University of Toronto with a Bachelor of Arts degree in English and history, and he did post-graduate studies in industrial relations and Ontario history.

Career 
Ramer joined the Metropolitan Toronto Police since 1980. He served as Deputy Chief of Specialized Operations Command under Chief Mark Saunders.

Following Saunders' resignation, Ramer was named interim chief on August 1, 2020.

On September 15, 2022, it was announced that Ramer will be succeeded as chief on December 19, 2022 by Myron Demkiw.

References 

Toronto police chiefs
Living people
University of Toronto alumni
Year of birth missing (living people)